The 2018 Apertura season served as the opening half of the 2017–18 Liga FPD season. It began on 29 July 2017 and ended on 23 December 2017.

Herediano entered as the defending champions, but lost the title in the Apertura finals to Pérez Zeledón.

Personnel and kits

Managerial changes

Notes
 1: Mario Viquez had already assumed as interim manager of Carmelite following Farinha's departure on 28 September.
 2: Adrián Leandro had already assumed as interim manager of Cartaginés following Delgado's departure on 10 November.

League table

Regular season
Defending champions Herediano topped the season undefeated with 54 points. By achieving this, Herediano broke two records in the league. They became the first team with the longest undefeated streak (surpassing the 21-match streak by Saprissa in the 2003–04 season, the team being coincidentally managed by Hernán Medford). The team also broke the record for more points achieved in a regular season, surpassing Alajuelense in the 2014 Invierno season.

On 3 September 2017, the match between Saprissa and Grecia was suspended at the 81st minute due to a false bomb threat. The remaining nine minutes were played the next morning.

Standings

Positions by round

Results

Quadrangular – Apertura

Teams qualified
Herediano 
Saprissa
Santos de Guápiles
Pérez Zeledón

Standings

Positions by round

Results

Apertura finals
Since regular season leaders Herediano were unable to top the quadrangular stage, a double-legged final will be played against the quadrangular winner Pérez Zeledón in order to determine the champions of the Apertura tournament. By getting more points in the aggregate table, Herediano will host the second leg.

Season statistics

Scoring

First goal of the season:   Luis Stewart Pérez for Saprissa against Carmelita (30 July)
Last goal of the season:  Jeikel Venegas for Pérez Zeledón against Herediano (20 December)

Top goalscorers
Source:

Hat-tricks

Goalkeeping

Foreign players
This is a list of foreign players in the 2017 Apertura season. The following players:

 Have played at least one game for the respective club.
 Have not been capped for the Costa Rica national football team on any level, independently from the birthplace

A new rule was introduced this season, that clubs can have four foreign players per club  and can only add a new player if there is an injury or a player(s) is released and it's before the close of the season transfer window.

References

External links
 UNAFUT - Primera División de Costa Rica

2017–18 in Costa Rican football